Events from the year 1738 in Canada.

Incumbents
French Monarch: Louis XV
British and Irish Monarch: George II

Governors
Governor General of New France: Charles de la Boische, Marquis de Beauharnois
Colonial Governor of Louisiana: Jean-Baptiste le Moyne de Bienville
Governor of Nova Scotia: Lawrence Armstrong
Commodore-Governor of Newfoundland: Jean-Baptiste Le Moyne de Bienville

Events
 Smallpox strikes the Cherokee in the U.S. Southeast, killing almost half the population. Smallpox also reaches tribes in western Canada.
 Esther Brandeau, in the guise of a cabin boy, is the first known Jewish woman to arrive in Canada. Eventually she is deported to France for failing to embrace the Roman Catholic religion.
 Fort Rouge (the fort), built on the Assiniboine River near the Forks.
 Fort La Reine, one of the forts of the Pierre Gaultier de Varennes et de La Vérendrye western expansion, was built. It was located on the Assiniboine River near where present day Portage la Prairie stands.
 Pierre Gaultier de Varennes et de La Vérendrye travelled southwest from Fort La Reine to the area of the Missouri River in what is now North Dakota.

Births
 June 25 - Thomas Peters, black soldier and leader (died 1792)

Historical documents
New York colonial officials describe French military assets

New York lieutenant governor warns against new French settlement and treaty with Senecas for fort that will end trade at Oswego

Regarding greater settlement of Nova Scotia, Council gives reasons it has not been possible (and it is not because they are military men)

Settlers with cattle have arrived on Sable Island, and will "Succour, Help and Releive[sic]" any shipwreck victims tossed up there

Tired of "meeting daily and almost constantly" to address litigious people's "frivolous and undigested Complaints," Council sets sittings

Lieutenant governor Armstrong tells official to act with "Lenity, Good humour and[...]live as Peaceably and Quietly with all men as possible"

Many of 8,000 men in Newfoundland fishery are "fresh land-men" who through hard work and weather "become pretty good sailors"

Newfoundland will begin prosecuting capital offences, sparing testifiers expensive trip to British court and loss of year's fishing

Newfoundland governor reports opposition to Irish Catholic immigrants for criminality and danger they pose to Protestants in any war

Cree promise La Vérendrye they will not trade at York Factory, and he builds fort at portage on which people "go to the English"

Program of events celebrating Pierre Gaultier de la Vérendrye's 1738 arrival in what is now Winnipeg

Chief factor at Churchill reports that many "Northern Indians" were "put to such Streights in the Winter" that many "perished with Hunger"

Correspondents discuss apparent but not yet accepted need to find Northwest Passage, and ways to increase enthusiasm for it

References

 
Canada
38